Nicole Gontier (born 17 November 1991) is an Italian biathlete. Born in Aosta but originally from Champorcher, Gontier competes in the Biathlon World Cup. Gontier has won a bronze medal at the Biathlon World Championships 2013 (4x6 km relay). She competed at the 2018 Winter Olympics in Pyeongchang.

World Cup

Podiums

References

External links
 IBU profile

1991 births
Living people
Italian female biathletes
Biathlon World Championships medalists
Biathletes at the 2014 Winter Olympics
Biathletes at the 2018 Winter Olympics
Olympic biathletes of Italy
People from Aosta
Sportspeople from Aosta Valley